The following is a list of Omega Delta Phi fraternity chapters, colonies and alumni organizations. Alumni organizations are established by alumni members at the city level. All undergraduate entities begin as colonies and later petition internally for chapter status.

Undergraduate chapters

| style="background-color:red"|

| style="background-color:red"|

| style="background-color:red"|

| style="background-color:red"|

| style="background-color:red"|

| style="background-color:red"|

| style="background-color:black"|

| style="background-color:red"|

| style="background-color:red"|

| style="background-color:red"|

| style="background-color:black"|

| style="background-color:red"|

| style="background-color:red"|

| style="background-color:black"|

| style="background-color:red"|

| style="background-color:silver"|

| style="background-color:red"|

| style="background-color:red"|

| style="background-color:silver"|

| style="background-color:red"|

| style="background-color:red"|

| style="background-color:black"|

| style="background-color:red"|

| style="background-color:black"| 

| style="background-color:red"|

| style="background-color:red"|

| style="background-color:silver"|

| style="background-color:red"|

| style="background-color:red"|

| style="background-color:black"|

| style="background-color:black"|

| style="background-color:red"|

| style="background-color:red"|

| style="background-color:silver"|

| style="background-color:red"|

| style="background-color:red"|

| style="background-color:red"|

| style="background-color:silver"|

| style="background-color:red"|

| style="background-color:red"|

| style="background-color:black"|

| style="background-color:red"|

| style="background-color:red"|

| style="background-color:red"|

| style="background-color:black"|

| style="background-color:red"|

| style="background-color:red"|

| style="background-color:red"|

| style="background-color:red"|

| style="background-color:red"|

| style="background-color:red"|

| style="background-color:red"|

| style="background-color:red"|

| style="background-color:red"|

| style="background-color:red"|

| style="background-color:red"|

| style="background-color:red"|

| style="background-color:red"|

| style="background-color:red"|

| style="background-color:red"|

| style="background-color:black"|

| style="background-color:red"|

| style="background-color:red"|

| style="background-color:silver"|

| style="background-color:red"|

| style="background-color:red"|

| style="background-color:red"|

| style="background-color:red"|

| style="background-color:red"|

| style="background-color:red"|

| style="background-color:red"|

| style="background-color:red"|

Undergraduate colonies

| style="background-color:black"|

| style="background-color:black"|

| style="background-color:silver"|

| style="background-color:black"|

| style="background-color:silver"|

| style="background-color:silver"|

| style="background-color:black"|

| style="background-color:black"|

| Style="background-color:silver"|

| Style="background-color:silver"|

| Style="background-color:silver"|

Alumni organizations

Dallas/Fort Worth
El Paso
Northeast
Northern California
Oklahoma
Phoenix
Rio Grande Valley
San Antonio
San Marcos
Pullman
Tucson
Utah

References

External links
Omega Delta Phi website

Hispanic and Latino American organizations
Omega Delta Phi
chapters